Citizen Duane is a 2006 Canadian comedy film.

Plot
Duane Balfour was born into a family of misfortune, in the prairie town of Ridgeburg. After losing a high school election against his enemy Chad, he decides to run for mayor against Chad's grandmother—Ridgeburg's Mayor Milton, who has been the incumbent for a ridiculously long time. Duane and a homeless man are the only two competing with Mayor Milton.

Duane has a long-standing resentment against Milton because she approved his father's shooting by the police. His father had become violent while trying, without success, to warn Milton and the townsfolk that the town's namesake ridge would soon collapse due to heavy mining and insect tunneling.

With the support of his brother Maurie, Duane tries, and fails, to win the election. After withdrawing from the race he and his uncle drive back to Duane's house from Ridgeburg's ridge. The camera pans down underground, showing an insect removing a rock from a tunnel under the ridge. This triggers a landslide, leading to the implosion of the ridge, which Duane and his uncle see from the back of their truck. The next morning, prior to the election results being announced, it is revealed Mayor Milton has had a heart attack after seeing the ridge collapse, presumably since she realized that Duane's father was right all along.

Later in the day it is announced that the homeless man has become mayor with three votes, Milton's votes being deemed invalid and Duane having dropped out of the election.

Cast

Recognition
 2008 Genie Award for Best Achievement in Overall Sound - John J. Thomson, Steph Carrier, Martin Lee - Nominee

External links
 
 
 

2006 films
Canadian political comedy films
2006 comedy films
English-language Canadian films
Films shot in Hamilton, Ontario
2000s English-language films
2000s Canadian films